The canton of Saint-Flour-2 is an administrative division of the Cantal department, southern France. It was created at the French canton reorganisation which came into effect in March 2015. Its seat is in Saint-Flour.

Communes 
The canton consists of the following communes:
 
Brezons 
Cézens
Cussac
Gourdièges
Lacapelle-Barrès
Malbo
Narnhac
Paulhac
Paulhenc
Pierrefort
Sainte-Marie
Saint-Flour (partly)
Saint-Martin-sous-Vigouroux
Tanavelle
Les Ternes
Valuéjols
Villedieu

References

Cantons of Cantal